South Monaghan was a parliamentary constituency in Ireland, returning one Member of Parliament (MP) to the House of Commons of the Parliament of the United Kingdom, from 1885 to 1922.

Prior to the 1885 general election the area was part of the Monaghan constituency. From 1922, on the establishment of the Irish Free State, it was not represented in the UK Parliament.

Boundaries
This constituency comprised the southern part of County Monaghan.

1885–1922: The baronies of Cremorne and Farney.

Members of Parliament

Elections

Elections in the 1880s

Elections in the 1890s

Elections in the 1900s

Daly resigns, prompting a by-election.

Elections in the 1910s

References

Westminster constituencies in County Monaghan (historic)
Dáil constituencies in the Republic of Ireland (historic)
Constituencies of the Parliament of the United Kingdom established in 1885
Constituencies of the Parliament of the United Kingdom disestablished in 1922